Plouaret is a commune in the Côtes-d'Armor department of Brittany in northwestern France. Plouaret-Trégor station has rail connections to Brest, Rennes, Lannion, Guingamp and Paris.

Population
Inhabitants of Plouaret are called plouarétais in French.

Breton language
The municipality launched a linguistic plan through Ya d'ar brezhoneg on 12 April 2007.

See also
Gare de Plouaret-Trégor
Communes of the Côtes-d'Armor department

References

External links

Plouaret

Communes of Côtes-d'Armor